Lystrophis is the genus of tricolored South American hognose snakes.
They mimic milk snakes or coral snakes with their red, black, and white ringed patterns.

Species
The genus Lystrophis contains five species that are recognized as being valid.
Lystrophis dorbignyi (A.M.C. Duméril, Bibron & A.H.A. Duméril, 1854) – southern Brazil and southern Paraguay to Argentina
Lystrophis histricus (Jan, 1863) – southern Brazil, Paraguay, and Uruguay to northeastern Argentina
Lystrophis nattereri (Steindachner, 1867) – southern Brazil
Lystrophis pulcher (Jan, 1863) – southern South America, parts of Brazil, Argentina, Paraguay and Bolivia
Lystrophis semicinctus (A.M.C. Duméril, Bibron & A.H.A. Duméril, 1854) – central Argentina to southern Bolivia and southwestern Brazil

Lystrophis dorbignyi is the type species for the genus Lystrophis.

Nota bene: A binomial authority in parentheses indicates that the species was originally described in a genus other than Lystrophis.

Taxonomy
All species of Lystrophis are sometimes included in the genus Xenodon.

References

Further reading
Boulenger GA (1894). Catalogue of the Snakes in the British Museum (Natural History). Volume II., Containing the Conclusion of the Colubridæ Aglyphæ. London: Trustees of the British Museum (Natural History). (Taylor and Francis, printers). xi + 382 pp. + Plates I–XX. (Genus Lystrophis, p. 151).
Cope ED (1885). "Twelfth Contribution to the Herpetology of Tropical America". Proc. American. Philos. Soc. 22 ["1884"]: 167–194. (Lystrophis, new genus, p. 193).
Tozetti AM, Pontes GMF, Martins MB, Oliveira RB (2010). "Temperature preferences of Xenodon dorbignyi : field and experimental observations". Herpetological Journal 20: 277–280.
Tozetti AM, Oliveira RB, Pontes GMF (2009). "Defensive repertoire of Xenodon dorbignyi (Serpentes, Dipsadidae)". Biota Neotropica (online edition in English) 9: 1–7.

External links
https://web.archive.org/web/20100925051139/http://hognose.com/pages/species/lystrophis.htm
http://www.pardalisberlin.de/index.php/lystrophis

Colubrids
Reptiles of South America
Snake genera
Taxa named by Edward Drinker Cope